San Augustine is the county seat city of San Augustine County, Texas, in East Texas, United States.

History
The first European settlement in the area began in 1717 with the establishment of Mission Nuestra Señora de los Dolores de los Ais by Spanish missionaries. The mission was abandoned and reestablished in 1721. It lasted until 1773 and is now preserved as Mission Dolores State Historic Site

The town began in 1832 with land owned by Thomas S. McFarland. The town was named after the Presidio de San Agustín de Ahumada, which had been named in honor of the (1755–1761) Viceroy of New Spain, Don Agustín de Ahumada y Villalón.

Geography

San Augustine is located at  (31.531086, –94.110971).

Climate

The climate in this area is characterized by hot, humid summers and generally mild to cool winters.  According to the Köppen Climate Classification system, San Augustine has a humid subtropical climate, abbreviated "Cfa" on climate maps.

Demographics

As of the 2020 United States census, there were 1,920 people, 982 households, and 536 families residing in the city.

As of the census of 2000, there were 2,475 people, 859 households, and 573 families living in the city. The population density was 525.2 people per square mile (202.9/km2). There were 1,076 housing units at an average density of 228.3/sq mi (88.2/km2). The racial makeup of the city was 37.82% White, 57.94% African American, 0.08% Native American, 0.69% Asian, 3.07% from other races, and 0.40% from two or more races. Hispanic or Latino of any race were 5.13% of the population.

There were 859 households, out of which 29.8% had children under the age of 18 living with them, 37.3% were married couples living together, 26.0% had a female householder with no husband present, and 33.2% were non-families. 30.5% of all households were made up of individuals, and 17.0% had someone living alone who was 65 years of age or older. The average household size was 2.57 and the average family size was 3.23.

In the city, the population was spread out, with 26.9% under the age of 18, 8.1% from 18 to 24, 22.6% from 25 to 44, 19.7% from 45 to 64, and 22.7% who were 65 years of age or older. The median age was 38 years. For every 100 females, there were 80.4 males. For every 100 females age 18 and over, there were 67.6 males.

The median income for a household in the city was $25,489, and the median income for a family was $33,203. Males had a median income of $23,750 versus $17,628 for females. The per capita income for the city was $14,918. About 19.1% of families and 24.7% of the population were below the poverty line, including 35.0% of those under age 18 and 30.7% of those age 65 or over.

Education
The city of San Augustine is served by the San Augustine Independent School District.
The city was once home to the University of San Augustine (Texas)

Notable people

 Kenneth Lewis Anderson, The last Vice President of the Republic of Texas
 Edward A. Clark, U.S. Ambassador to Australia
 Dominique Edison, Seattle Seahawks wide receiver
 Joseph Barton Elam, U.S. Representative from Louisiana's 4th congressional district from 1877 to 1881; spent part of his childhood near San Augustine
 John A. Greer, Lieutenant Governor of Texas
 Frances Cox Henderson, wife of Governor Henderson, helped establish Episcopal Church in San Augustine
 J. Pinckney Henderson, The first governor of the State of Texas
 Sam Houston, First President of the Republic of Texas
 Kenneth M. Hoyt, U.S. District Judge 
 Memucan Hunt, Jr., Secretary of the Navy of the Republic of Texas and Texas' Minister to the United States
 Ben Ramsey, Texas Lieutenant Governor
 John A Ramsey, prominent libertarian entrepreneur and philanthropist. (Nephew to Ben Ramsey)
 Oran M. Roberts, Governor
 Franklin Barlow Sexton, Texas Senator, Grand Commander of the Knights Templar of Texas

Photo gallery

References

External links
 City of San Augustine, Texas
 Texas State Historical Association
 Chamber of Commerce

Cities in San Augustine County, Texas
Cities in Texas
County seats in Texas